Abu Nasr Sa'd ibn Ali ibn Yusuf, known by the regnal name al-Musta'in bi-llah and as Ciriza (a corruption of Sidi Sa'd) or Mulay Zad ("Lord Sa'd) to the Christian chroniclers, was the twentieth Nasrid ruler of the  Moorish Emirate of Granada in Al-Andalus on the Iberian Peninsula.

References

Sources 
 
 

Sultans of Granada
15th-century monarchs in Europe
14th-century births
1465 deaths
15th century in Al-Andalus
Year of birth unknown
15th-century Arabs